Love in the Desert is a 1929 American drama film directed by George Melford and starring Olive Borden, Hugh Trevor, and Noah Beery. Originally made as a silent film, sound was then added and it was released in two separate versions.

Cast

Preservation status
Prints of Love in the Desert survive in Cineteca Del Friuli (Gemona) and Centre national du cinéma et de l'image animée (Fort de Bois-d'Arcy).

References

Bibliography
 Hsu-Ming Teo. Desert Passions: Orientalism and Romance Novels. University of Texas Press, 2012.

External links

1929 films
1920s English-language films
Films directed by George Melford
American black-and-white films
American drama films
1929 drama films
Film Booking Offices of America films
1920s American films